Anaphe johnstonei is a moth of the  family Notodontidae. It was described by Tams in 1932. It is found in Malawi.

References

 Natural History Museum Lepidoptera generic names catalog

Endemic fauna of Malawi
Notodontidae
Moths described in 1932
Moths of Africa